is a Japanese actor and voice actor from Tokyo. He is best known for his role as Kai Samezu/GaoBlue in the Super Sentai series Hyakujuu Sentai Gaoranger.

Filmography

Television
 Hyakujuu Sentai Gaoranger (2001–2002) (Kai Samezu/Gao Blue)
 GoGo Sentai Boukenger (Ragi)
 Denace (2006)

Video games
 Grandia 3 (Ull/Ulf)

Film
 Boogiepop and Others (2000)
 Hyakujuu Sentai Gaoranger vs. Super Sentai (2001) (Kai Samezu/Gao Blue)
 Hyakujuu Sentai Gaoranger Fire Mountain Roars (2001) (Kai Samezu/Gao Blue)
 Battle Royale II: Requiem (2003) (Shugo Urabe)
 Hirakata (Takahito Murata)
 Reflections (2005)
 Boku no Kanojo tosono Kareshi ~Drop In Ghost~ (2007) (Ryo Fuuma)

Stage shows
 Kikai Sentai Zenkaiger vs. Hyakujuu Sentai Gaoranger Special Battle Stage (2021) (Kai Samezu/Gao Blue)

External links
Takeru Shibaki's Homepage

1982 births
Living people
Japanese male film actors
Japanese male voice actors
Male voice actors from Tokyo